Agonidium rhytoctonum is a species of ground beetle in the subfamily Platyninae. It was described by Basilewsky in 1976.

References

rhytoctonum
Beetles described in 1976